István Gyarmati is a Hungarian political scientist. He is a member of the council of the International Institute for Strategic Studies. He is senior advisor on South East Europe at the Geneva Centre for the Democratic Control of Armed Forces, and chairman of the Centre for Euro-Atlantic Integration and Democracy.

References

Year of birth missing (living people)
Living people
Budapest University of Technology and Economics alumni
Hungarian political scientists
NATO personnel